Sesiones: 10 Años Acústicos y Eléctricos is a live recording released by Puerto Rican rock band Fiel a la Vega on December 18, 2007. It was recorded at the Ambassador Hotel in March 2007 in San Juan, Puerto Rico.

Track listing
(All songs written by Tito Auger, except where noted)
 "La Prosperidad" (Auger, Laureano)
 "Breve Anécdota de Heroismo Folcklórico de Fin de Milenio"
 "Hay Que Edificar" (Laureano)
 "Canción Para Vieques" (Auger, Laureano)
 "A Quien Pueda Interesar"
 "Boricua en la Luna" (Brown, Corretjer)
 "Banderas"
 "Salimos de Aquí"
 "El Panal" (Auger, Laureano)
 "'86"
 "El Wanabí"
 "Una Plegaria Mas (Padre Nuestro)"

Personnel
 Tito Auger – Vocals, Guitars
 Ricky Laureano – Vocals, Guitars
 Jorge Arraiza – Bass, backing vocals
 Pedro Arraiza – drums, backing vocals
Guest Musicians: 
 Roy Brown - Vocals, Guitar
 Ricardo Dávila - Violin, Arrangements
 César Augusto Díaz - Violin
 Yolanda Guerrios - Viola
 Harry Almodóvar - Cello
 Julito Alvarado - Trumpet
 Antonio Vázquez - Trombone
 Frankie Pérez - Tenor Sax and Flute
 Tato Santiago - Keyboards

References

Live video albums
2007 live albums
2007 video albums